James Major may refer to:

James Earl Major (1887–1972), U.S. federal judge 
James Patrick Major (1836–1877), American Civil War soldier